The 2015 Boyd Tinsley Women's Clay Court Classic was a professional tennis tournament played on outdoor clay courts. It was the fourteenth edition of the tournament and part of the 2015 ITF Women's Circuit, offering a total of $50,000 in prize money. It took place in Charlottesville, Virginia, United States, on 27 April–3 May 2015.

Singles main draw entrants

Seeds 

 1 Rankings as of 20 April 2015

Other entrants 
The following players received wildcards into the singles main draw:
  Usue Maitaine Arconada
  Tornado Alicia Black
  Julia Elbaba
  Rianna Valdes

The following players received entry from the qualifying draw:
  Nicole Frenkel
  Elizaveta Ianchuk
  Vojislava Lukić
  Storm Sanders

The following player received entry by a lucky loser:
  Angelina Gabueva

The following player received entry from a protected ranking:
  Jessica Pegula

The following player received entry by a special exempt:
  Katerina Stewart

Champions

Singles

 Allie Kiick def.  Katerina Stewart, 7–5, 6–7(3–7), 7–5

Doubles

 Françoise Abanda  /  Maria Sanchez def.  Olga Ianchuk /  Irina Khromacheva, 6–1, 6–3

External links 
 2015 Boyd Tinsley Women's Clay Court Classic at ITFtennis.com
 Official website

2015 ITF Women's Circuit
2015
2015
2015 in American tennis